Football at the 2019 Military World Games was held in Wuhan, China from 16 to 27 October 2019.

Venues
Below the list of different venues of the football tournament.

Medal summary

Results

Medal table

References

External links
Football tournament of the 7th Military World Games  - Official website of the 2019 Military World Games
Results book – Football

Football
2019
2019
2019 in Chinese football